The Present is a 2020 short film directed by Farah Nabulsi and co-written by Nabulsi and Hind Shoufani, about a father and daughter in the Palestinian enclaves of the Israeli-occupied West Bank trying to buy a wedding anniversary gift. The cast is led by Palestinian actor Saleh Bakri. It was released on Netflix on 18 March 2021, and was nominated for the Academy Award for Best Live Action Short Film.

In 2021, it won the BAFTA Award for Best Short Film.

Summary

The film is about a father and daughter in the Palestinian enclaves of the Israeli-occupied West Bank trying to buy a wedding anniversary gift.

The film opens with Yusef (Saleh Bakri) waiting to cross the overcrowded Checkpoint 300, near Bethlehem, in the early morning. The scene was produced on location with guerrilla filmmaking; Nabulsi described it as "probably the most rewarding scene” in the film to make":

Later, at Yusef's home, he and his wife Noor (Mariam Kamel Basha) discuss their wedding anniversary. Yusef says he is going on a shopping trip to Beitunia to buy a gift, with their daughter Yasmine (Maryam Kanj).

Their progress in both directions is impeded by a variety of checkpoints. In an important later scene, a group of young Israeli soldiers argue with each other over “what a seemingly more senior soldier views as the insufficiently uncompromising, perhaps insufficiently inhumane, behavior of his junior.”

Accolades
The film premiered at the Clermont-Ferrand International Short Film Festival, where it won the Audience Award for Best Film. It subsequently won awards at the Cleveland International Film Festival, the Brooklyn Film Festival, and the Palm Springs International Festival of Short Films.

In 2021, it was nominated for the Academy Award for Best Live Action Short Film and won the BAFTA Award for Best Short Film.

Reviews 
The film received 5-star reviews by the UK Film Review and Eye for Film, and 4-star reviews by For Reel and View of the Arts. Madison Ford, writing in the UK Film Review, described the film as "an eye-opening piece of art that captivates from the offset", whilst Taylor Beaumont in For Reel writes that the film is a "fantastic showcase for the restrained but powerful acting talents of Saleh Bakri and... a powerful snapshot of the humanity some of us sacrifice just to buy our eggs for the week". In an interview with Nabulsi, film journalist E. Nina Rothe wrote that the film's name can refer to both a gift and the present day.

A Hebrew-language review from Amir Bogen in Ynet comparing The Present with the Israeli film White Eye states that it surprising to see The Present in the shortlist for Academy Awards given the plot pattern, its emotional exploitation, and its conscious simplicity and goes on to say "it presents one-sided messages and a loss of authenticity to the situation (not to mention the Hebrew with a strong Arabic accent of the soldiers played by Palestinian actors)".

See also
Cinema of Palestine
List of Palestinian submissions for the Academy Award for Best International Feature Film

References

External links

2020 short films
2020 drama films
Palestinian short films
Palestinian drama films